The Mid-America Arts Alliance (MAAA), headquartered in Kansas City, Missouri, is one of six not-for-profit regional arts organizations funded by the National Endowment for the Arts (NEA). Founded in 1972, MAAA creates and manages regional, multi-regional, national, and international programs including traveling exhibitions, performing arts touring, and professional and community development. The Alliance serves the state arts councils of Arkansas, Kansas, Missouri, Nebraska, Oklahoma, and Texas.

References

External links
Mid-America Arts Alliance 
US Regional Arts Organizations

Arts organizations based in Missouri
Organizations based in Kansas City, Missouri
Arts organizations established in 1972
1972 establishments in the United States